John Beaton is a Scottish football referee.

Career

Football 

He has refereed at the UEFA U17 Championship Qualifying Tournament in 2009 and the Scottish Junior Cup Final. He refereed two games at UEFA u19 Elite Round in Serbia in May 2012. His first Europa League match appointment is 5 July 2012 Elsborg v Floriana.

In March 2010 he was stuck in snow gates overnight on the A9 in Scotland after refereeing an Elgin City match, along with the Queen's Park team.

Beaton became a FIFA referee in 2012. He appeared as a fourth official in the 2014 World Cup qualifier between Romania and the Netherlands.

In May 2015, Beaton refereed the Riyadh derby between Al Hilal and Al Nassr in the Saudi Professional League, where Salem Al-Dawsari motioned to head-butt him after a decision didn't go his way.

Non football
 
Outside of football  Beaton started his career as a journalist before becoming communications officer for Strathclyde Police. He is currently media relations manager at ScotRail Alliance having previously been a communications officer for the University of Strathclyde.

References

1982 births
Living people
Scottish football referees
Scottish Football League referees
Scottish Premier League referees
Scottish Professional Football League referees
https://www.fourfourtwo.com/news/hibernians-paul-mcginn-accuses-john-beaton-of-inept-refereeing-in-cup-final-1639943536000